Kerala Fashion League (KFL) is an annual fashion event held in Crowne Plaza, Kochi, India that provides opportunities to designers to showcase their collections. It was founded in 2015 by Abhil dev. The first season of Kerala Fashion League was held at Kochi on 27 May 2015. 

KFL aims at promoting local designers and displaying their collection along with the leading brands in the country. It also serves as a platform to young aspiring models to display their talent.

Activities
Through many seasons of Kerala fashion league, numerous celebrities and models have walked the ramp. Indian film stars such as Mohanlal, Yash, Soha Ali Khan, Zareen Khan, Warina Hussain, Madhoo, Pearle Maaney, Priyamani, Amala Paul, S.Sreesanth, Samyukta Menon, Prayaga Martin, Isha Talwar, Akansha puri, Govind Padmasoorya (GP), Prasanna Sujit Master, Unni Mukundan are few of the celebrities who walked the Kerala Fashion League ramp. The models include Dayana Erappa, Archana Akhil Kumar, Noyonita Lodh.

James Ferreira, Rehane, Sidney Sladen, Asmita Marwa, Jayanthi Ballal, Shravan Ramaswamy, Ramesh Dembla are some of the leading designers of the show. Many renowned designers  participate from major cities including Delhi, Bangalore, New York, Chennai, Hyderabad, and Mumbai.

The shows are choreographed by Rashmi Virmani, MS Sridhar, Dalu Krishnadas, Jude Felix and Jackie Besterwitch while Robert Naorem takes care of hair and make-up.

Seasons

 Kerala Fashion League Season 1 - 24 January 2015 - Crowne Plaza, Kochi
 Kerala Fashion League Season 2 - 27 May - 2015 - Kochi
 Kerala Fashion League Season 3 - 3 March 2016 - Kochi
 Kerala Fashion League Season 4 - 23 November 2016 - Kochi
 Kerala Fashion League Season 5 - 31 January 2018 - Kochi
 Kerala Fashion League Season 6 - 23 February 2019 - Thrissur
 Kerala Fashion League Season 7 - 11 & 12 April 2019 - Calicut
 Kerala Fashion League Season 8 - 3 May 2019 - Dubai
 Kerala Fashion League Season 9 - 12 February 2020 - Bangalore
 Kerala Fashion League Season 10 - 22 October 2021 - Bangalore
 Kerala Fashion League Season 11 - 20th April 2022 - Kochi

See also
 India Fashion Week
 Lakmé Fashion Week
 Bangalore Fashion Week

References

 The Kerala Fashion League Season 4 Rocks KochiRitz Magazine
 Kerala Fashion League to Roll Out Designer ShowDeccan Chronicle
 Zareen Khan Scorches the Kerala Fashion League Ramp Without FearMid-day

External links
Official Kerala Fashion League Site
youtube.com/KERALAFASHIONLEAGUE
instagram.com/kfl_keralafashionleague

Annual events in India
Fashion events in India